The 7th Support Group was a supporting formation within the British 7th Armoured Division, active during the Second World War's Western Desert Campaign.

History
The 7th Support Group was formed from the expansion of the 7th Armoured Division's existing pivot group. The pivot group, and later the support group, controlled the division's motorised infantry, field artillery, anti-tank guns, and light anti-aircraft guns. While the artillery would provide support for the tanks on an attack, the infantry were intended to protect the division's base or occupy territory captured by the tanks and not supplement them. Towards the end of Operation Crusader, the support group joined the 1st Armoured Division for a couple of weeks before reverting to the command of the 7th Armoured Division. The 7th Support Group was abolished in February 1942, after Crusader came to an end, following a reorganization of the British armoured forces in North Africa.

Commanders
 Lieutenant-Colonel E. S. B. Williams (acting), form 22 January 1940
 Brigadier William Gott - initially the acting commander from 31 January 1940. Gott was then promoted from Lieutenant-Colonel to Brigadier, to officially become the formations commander from 16 February 1940.
 Brigadier John Campbell - Took command on 12 September 1941. During his tenure as commander, Campbell earned the Victoria Cross.

Order of battle

Western Desert Force, 1939
 4th Regiment, Royal Horse Artillery
 1st Kings Royal Rifle Corps
 2nd Rifle Brigade

Operation Compass
 4th Regiment, Royal Horse Artillery
 1st Kings Royal Rifle Corps
 2nd Rifle Brigade

Operation Battleaxe, June 1941
 1st Regiment, Royal Horse Artillery
 4th Regiment, Royal Horse Artillery
 1st Kings Royal Rifle Corps
 2nd Rifle Brigade

Operation Crusader, November 1941
 3rd Regiment, Royal Horse Artillery
 4th Regiment, Royal Horse Artillery
 1st Kings Royal Rifle Corps
 2nd Rifle Brigade
 60th (North Midland) Field Regiment, Royal Artillery
 One Bty, 51st Field Regiment, Royal Artillery

Footnotes

References

See also
 List of British brigades of the Second World War

External links
 British artillery in World War 2
 7th Support Group

7 Support
Military units and formations established in 1938
Military units and formations disestablished in 1942